Gökhan Kök  (born 3 January 1981, in Bulanık) is a Turkish retired football defender.

External links
 Profile & Statistics at Guardian's Stats Centre
 Profile at TFF.org.tr 

1981 births
Living people
Turkish footballers
Association football defenders
Göztepe S.K. footballers
Sakaryaspor footballers
Kayseri Erciyesspor footballers
Çaykur Rizespor footballers
İnegölspor footballers
People from Bulanık